The Tobacco MSA with Hawaii is the particular version of the Tobacco MSA that was signed by Hawaii, was enabled by means of legislation of Hawaii, and has been interpreted since then in Hawaii state courts.

On January 31, 1997, Hawaii sued the major domestic tobacco companies, seeking damages for costs related to tobacco injuries and illnesses suffered by its Medicaid recipients. Hawaii's lawsuit covered was based on various grounds, including false advertising, fraudulent and negligence misrepresentation, civil conspiracy, negligence, product liability, and restitution for health care costs for recipients of public assistance.

On November 23, 1998, Hawaii, along with 45 other states that had filed similar actions against the tobacco companies, entered into a "global" settlement. Under the Master settlement agreement ("MSA"), which memorialized the "global" settlement, the tobacco companies agreed to take steps aimed at reducing or eliminating tobacco use by minors and educating the public at large about the dangers of tobacco use. MSA, at 18–47, available at http://www.library.ucsf.edu/tobacco/litigation (Nov. 1998). The tobacco companies also agreed to pay various sums to the settling states over 25 years, in amounts to be calculated based upon a complex formula. Id. at 112–114. It is estimated that at the end of the 25-year payout, Hawaii will have received as much as $1.38 billion.

Hawaii has established the Hawaii Tobacco Settlement Special Fund, into which its share of the tobacco settlement proceeds will be deposited. Under related state legislation, effective July 1, 2002 the settlement funds received by Hawaii will be allocated as follows: (1) twenty-four and one-half percent to the emergency and budget reserve fund; (2) thirty-five percent to the Department of Health for funding the children's health insurance program and the department's health promotion and disease prevention programs; (3) twelve and one-half percent to the Hawaii Tobacco Prevention and Control Trust Fund; and (4) twenty-eight percent to the university revenue-undertakings fund for the payment, as may be necessary, of principal and interest on revenue bonds issued to finance construction of a health and wellness center, including a new medical school facility, at the University of Hawaii in Honolulu. Haw. Rev. Stat. § 328L-2 (2001).

References
Cardenas v. Anzai, 311 F.3d 929 (9th Cir., 2002) (quoted verbatim from public-domain source)

Smoking in the United States
Hawaii law
Health in Hawaii